The Eugene Streeter House, at 335 Ontario Ave. in Park City, Utah, was built around 1885.  It was listed on the National Register of Historic Places in 1984.

It is a one-story frame "T/L cottage" with a gable roof, with a porch on the west side of the stem-wing.  A rear shed extension was added before 1889.

It was vacant and in deteriorated condition in 1984, with no doors or windows.

References

National Register of Historic Places in Summit County, Utah
Houses completed in 1885